Hypnotic is a class of drugs, commonly known as sleeping pills.

Hypnotic may also refer to:

 Hypnosis, an induced mental state or set of attitudes

Music
 Hypnotic Records, an American independent record label
 Hypnotic (album), by Wild Orchid, 2003
 "Hypnotic" (song), a 2015 song by Zella Day
 Hypnotic, a 2003 album by Thyrane
 Hypnotic, a 2016 album by Wilkinson
 "Hypnotic", a song by Holly Valance from her album State of Mind
 "Hypnotic", a song by Bomfunk Mc's from their album Reverse Psychology
 "Hypnotic", a song by Tweet

Film and television
 Hypnotic (production company)
 Hypnotic (2021 film), a film directed by Matt Angel and Suzanne Coote
 Hypnotic (2023 film), a film directed by Robert Rodriguez
 "Hypnotic" (Smallville), an episode of the American television series Smallville
 Hypnotic, an alternate title for 2002 film Doctor Sleep

See also
 Hypnotic Brass Ensemble, an American jazz group
 Hypnotica (Benny Benassi album), a 2003 album by Benny Benassi
 "Hypnotik", a song by Alesha Dixon from Fired Up
 Hpnotiq, a brand of liqueur